Thayer Township is an inactive township in Oregon County, in the U.S. state of Missouri.

Thayer Township took its name from the community of Thayer, Missouri.

References

Townships in Missouri
Townships in Oregon County, Missouri